Hypodoxa regina is a moth of the family Geometridae first described by Louis Beethoven Prout in 1916. It is found on New Guinea.

Subspecies
Hypodoxa regina regina (Rook Island)
Hypodoxa regina pallida Joicey & Talbot, 1917 (New Guinea)

References

Moths described in 1916
Pseudoterpnini